Amir Zalani is a Singaporean footballer who plays for Hougang United FC as a striker as of 2021. He previously played for Home United FC.

Club career

Home United
He was promoted to the senior squad in 2016 after impressing with the prime league team.  He was the captain of the prime league team and played 19 games (with 10 goals) in 2015 prime league team. He scored two goals in the 2016 Singapore FA Cup finals against NFL side Siglap FC and securing his club's second consecutive FA Cup trophy.

He made his senior debut as a substitute on 11 June 2016 in a draw against Gerena Young Lions.

Hougang United
Zalani left Home United to join Hougang United in 2017.

On 10 June 2021, Amir returned to Hougang United after completing his national service duty. He will be wearing jersey number 29.

International career
He was called up to represent Singapore's U21 team in 2017.

References

External links
 Amir Zalani at Hougang United FC

Singaporean footballers
Living people
1996 births
Association football forwards
Home United FC players